This is a list of Bangladeshi films that were released in 2007.

Releases

See also

 List of Bangladeshi films of 2008
 List of Bangladeshi films
 Cinema of Bangladesh

References

External links 
 Bangladeshi films on Internet Movie Database

Film
Bangladesh
 2007